Electric Boogaloo: The Wild, Untold Story of Cannon Films is a 2014 Australian-American documentary film written and directed by Mark Hartley. It tells the story of cousins Menahem Golan and Yoram Globus who headed The Cannon Group. Those interviewed lay tribute to the brash, unconventional immigrant filmmakers who gave young actors a chance and give unflinching anecdotes of both the hits and the low budget and often crass films created.

Interviewees

 Olivia d'Abo
 John G. Avildsen
 Martine Beswick
 Richard Chamberlain
 Sybil Danning
 Boaz Davidson
 Bo Derek
 Lucinda Dickey
 Michael Dudikoff
 Robert Forster
 Diane Franklin
 Elliott Gould
 Tobe Hooper
 Just Jaeckin
 Laurene Landon
 Avi Lerner
 Dolph Lundgren
 Franco Nero
 Cassandra Peterson
 Molly Ringwald
 Robin Sherwood
 Marina Sirtis
 Catherine Mary Stewart
 Alex Winter
 Franco Zeffirelli

List of films prominently featured

 Allan Quatermain and the Lost City of Gold
 America 3000
 American Ninja
 The Apple
 Avenging Force
 Barfly
 Beat Street
 Body and Soul
 Bolero
 Breakin'
 Breakin' 2: Electric Boogaloo
 That Championship Season
 A Cry in the Dark
 Cyborg
 Death Wish II
 Death Wish 3
 Death Wish 4: The Crackdown
 The Delta Force
 Enter the Ninja
 Revenge of the Ninja
 Ninja III: The Domination
 Exterminator 2
 Fool for Love
 The Forbidden Dance
 Going Bananas
 The Happy Hooker Goes Hollywood
 Hercules
 Hospital Massacre (aka X-Ray)
 House of the Long Shadows
 Inga
 Invaders from Mars
 Invasion U.S.A.
 Joe
 Journey to the Center of the Earth
 King Lear
 King Solomon's Mines
 Kinjite: Forbidden Subjects
 Lady Chatterley's Lover
 Lambada
 The Last American Virgin
 Lemon Popsicle
 Lifeforce
 Love Streams
 Masters of the Universe
 Mata Hari
 Messenger of Death
 Missing in Action
 Missing in Action 2: The Beginning
 New Year's Evil
 Operation Thunderbolt
 Otello
 Over the Brooklyn Bridge
 Over the Top
 Runaway Train
 Sahara
 Salsa
 Schizoid
 Superman IV: The Quest for Peace
 10 to Midnight
 The Texas Chainsaw Massacre 2
 Treasure of San Lucas
 The Wicked Lady

Production
The film was partly funded by Brett Ratner's RatPac-Dune Entertainment. Other investors included the Melbourne International Film Festival’s Premiere Fund, Film Victoria, and Screen Queensland.

Release
Electric Boogaloo had its world premiere in August 2014 at the Melbourne International Film Festival, and was shown in October 2014 at the BFI London Film Festival.

Critical reception
The film received critical acclaim. review aggregation website Rotten Tomatoes gives the film has a 95% approval rating, based on reviews from 37 critics, with an average rating of 7.4/10. The site's consensus states: "Electric Boogaloo: The Wild, Untold Story of Cannon Films pays tribute to the titular studio with an affectionate look back that's arguably more entertaining than much of Cannon's own B-movie product."

Home media
The film was released on Blu-ray by Ascot Elite Home Entertainment in 2015.

See also
 Not Quite Hollywood: The Wild, Untold Story of Ozploitation!, a 2008 documentary film also by Hartley
 The Go-Go Boys: The Inside Story of Cannon Films, a 2014 documentary film also about Cannon Films
 American Grindhouse, a 2010 documentary film similar in content

References

External links
 
 
 

2014 films
2014 documentary films
Australian documentary films
Documentary films about the film industry
The Cannon Group, Inc.
Films directed by Mark Hartley
American documentary films
2010s English-language films
2010s American films